Lightning's Shadow is a game developed by Wolfire Games and was one of the winners of the uDevGame 2003 contest, out of about 60 contestants. In Lightning's Shadow players control a powerful monk and hurl fireballs, lightning bolts and ice shards at their friends or at the AI. It works with multiple players on the same computer, or over the internet.

It is currently only available on Mac OS 9. As the developer lost the source code in a hard drive crash, there are no ports for modern platforms.

References

External links
 Lightning's Shadow Website

2003 video games
Classic Mac OS games
Classic Mac OS-only games
Strategy video games
Video games developed in the United States
Wolfire Games games

Multiplayer and single-player video games